UFC is a brand of banana ketchup owned by Nutri-Asia, Inc. The brand was first introduced in the Philippines in 1969 by Universal Foods Corporation.

History
Banana ketchup was deemed a cheaper alternative than tomato ketchup since bananas were abundant in the Philippines. Philippine food technologist Maria Y. Orosa (1893–1945) is credited with inventing the banana ketchup recipe.

Coincidentally, Magdalo V. Francisco came up with his own method of making ketchup using bananas in 1938. In 1942, he began commercial production of banana ketchup under the brand name Mafran, a portmanteau derived from the first syllables of his first name and surname. He registered Mafran as a trademark with the Bureau of Patents in the Philippines.

Years later, Francisco approached Tirso T. Reyes for funding to expand his business. This led to the establishment of the Universal Foods Corporation in 1960. Francisco soon left the company due to internal conflicts. Francisco established Jufran Food Industries and launched Jufran Banana Catsup. The name Jufran was derived from Francisco's son and namesake, Magdalo "Jun" Francisco Jr.

In 1969, Universal Foods Corporation launched UFC Tamis Anghang Banana Catsup, made from a unique recipe which combines the sweetness preferred by the Filipino palate with a spicy aftertaste, hence, tamis-anghang (Tagalog for sweet-spicy).

In 1974, Universal Foods Corporation was acquired by Bancom Development Corporation.

In 1996, Southeast Asia Food, Inc. (SAFI, now NutriAsia) acquired Universal Foods Corporation. SAFI had also acquired the Mafran and Jufran brands. SAFI evolved into what is now Nutri-Asia, Inc.

Products
UFC Tamis Anghang Banana Ketchup Regular
UFC Tamis Anghang Hot and Spicy
UFC Sweet Chili Sauce
UFC Hot Sauce
UFC Spaghetti Sauce
UFC Tomato Sauce
UFC Tomato Sauce Guisado
UFC Tomato Sauce Ready Recipes 
Caldereta
Afritada
Mechado
UFC Ready Recipes
Curry Mix
Menudo/Afritada Mix
Palabok Mix
Caldereta Mix
Gata Mix
Kare-Kare Mix
UFC Sinigang sa Sampalok Mix
UFC Hapi Fiesta Cooking Oil
UFC Gravy Sa Sarap Ready-To-Use Gravy
UFC Spices
Chili Powder
Curry Powder
Ground Pepper
Whole Pepper
Iodized Salt
Achuete
Bay Leaves
Chili Flakes
Cracked Pepper
Garlic Powder
UFC Fresh Selections
Green Peas
Whole Mushroom
Pieces & Stem Mushroom
Whole Kernel Corn
Sliced Young Corn

See also
 Banana ketchup

References

Food brands of the Philippines
NutriAsia brands
Philippine condiments
Brand name condiments
Ketchup